Dithalama is a genus of moths in the family Geometridae.

Species
 Dithalama cosmospila Meyrick, 1888
 Dithalama desueta (Warren, 1902)
 Dithalama persalsa (Warren, 1902)
 Dithalama punctilinea (Swinhoe, 1902)

References

External links
 Dithalama at Markku Savela's Lepidoptera and Some Other Life Forms
 Natural History Museum Lepidoptera genus database

Scopulini
Geometridae genera